Power Stone 2 (パワーストーン 2, Pawā Sutōn 2) is a multiplayer fighting game that built on the innovative gameplay introduced by its predecessor, Power Stone. Power Stone 2 allows up to four players to choose from multiple characters and utilize items such as tables, chairs, and rocks in battle.
 
Power Stone 2 originated as an arcade game, like many others on the Dreamcast. The Dreamcast served as a testing ground for successful arcade games. Power Stone 2 included some differences from the original, including new character voices, the removal of the existing combo system and a new, horizontal status bar.

Gameplay
There are four different modes available for the game:
1-on-1: Much like the original Power Stone, a two-character storyline game.
Arcade: A four-character storyline game, with two characters advancing each round.
Original: Multiplayer mode, with free choice of characters and stages.
Adventure: An unpredictable storyline game, where players can collect items, cards and money.

Power Stone 2 offers five interactive 3-D stages to begin with, plus the two boss stages which players can also access in Original mode. All but the Original mode is played out like a storyline, where two battles are fought on the regular stages, followed by the Pharaoh Walker boss, then another battle, and ending with the Dr. Erode boss stage. Three extra stages may be unlocked for Original mode by meeting certain requirements in Arcade mode, as well as a desert area stage, which is essentially the Pharaoh Walker boss stage, but without the boss. Though each player has their own set of default ground and air attacks, the character can execute more powerful fusion attacks after collecting three Power Stones and transforming. Power Stone 2 does not offer an opportunity to block, although tapping on the control pad just before an enemy attacks will cause you to dodge.

Most of the stages are dynamic and will change as the battle progresses. For example, the airplane stage starts out on a warplane. After a set amount of time, the plane will fall apart, forcing all the players to battle while skydiving toward the ground. Shortly after, the players will fall onto a floating platform, where the remainder of the battle will be held. This, in essence, creates three sub-stages within a single one.

Each stage is also littered with item boxes, which hold a random item that a player has acquired and unlocked in Adventure mode or created in the Item Shop. They may also contain Power Stones. Items are extremely diverse. Damaging items range from guns, flamethrowers, gigantic hammers, a wide assortment of swords, to bear traps, roller blades, and even a magazine that can be thrown. Non-damaging items include food that will replenish health, shields for defense, elixirs for invisibility, adhesive sprays to slow your opponents, and wings for extra jumps. Cards that can be used to mix items can also be found in Adventure mode. Furthermore, most stages also have their own collection of unique items and fixtures that the player can use. For example, the submarine level comes with turrets, small planes to drop bombs, and icebergs to throw at opponents. Each level is also highly interactive, as players can use many of the stage elements themselves. All players can also gain extra height by jumping off a wall.

Item Shop
An addition to Power Stone 2 is the "Adventure" mode. This mode is functionally identical to the "1-on-1" and "Arcade" modes; however, there is an additional inventory filled with items and money that the player has collected. These may then be taken to the game's "Item Shop", run by secret character Mel. The overall goal of the Item Shop is to allow players to gain access to new items; either by purchasing them, or by combining existing items in a 'mixing' process. This gives the game considerable additional longevity, as many of the best or most entertaining items are available only from the Item Shop. 
Power Stone 2 includes a VMU application called the Mini-Book. This can be used to inspect the player's item inventory, or trade items with another player. Additionally, a player may register up to five items in their inventory as "Handy Items". These may then appear to the player in Original mode, offering a tactical advantage.

Reception

In Japan, Game Machine listed Power Stone 2 on their June 15, 2000 issue as being the seventeenth most-successful arcade game of the month.

Matt Sammons reviewed the Dreamcast version of the game for Next Generation, rating it four stars out of five, and stated that "an innovative and beautiful fighting game, Power Stone 2 will keep you entertained for hours. Just make sure to bring along a few friends".

The Dreamcast version received "favorable" reviews according to video game review aggregator Metacritic. In Japan, Famitsu gave it a score of 31 out of 40.

References

External links

2000 video games
Fighting games
Platform fighters
3D fighting games
Arcade video games
Capcom games
Dreamcast games
Gemstones in fiction
Video game sequels
Multiplayer and single-player video games
Video games developed in Japan
Video games scored by Tetsuya Shibata
Video games with AI-versus-AI modes
PlayStation Portable games